John Davenport Clarke (January 15, 1873 – November 5, 1933) was a Republican member of the United States House of Representatives from New York.

Biography
Clarke was born in Hobart, New York. He graduated from Lafayette College in 1898 and Brooklyn Law School in 1911. He was assistant to the secretary of mines of the United States Steel Corporation from 1901 until 1907. He was elected to Congress in 1920 and served from March 4, 1921, until March 3, 1925. He was again elected to Congress in 1926 and served from March 4, 1927, until his death in a car crash near Delhi, New York.

External links

See also
 List of United States Congress members who died in office (1900–49)

Sources

1873 births
1933 deaths
Lafayette College alumni
Colorado College alumni
Brooklyn Law School alumni
New York (state) lawyers
Road incident deaths in New York (state)
Republican Party members of the United States House of Representatives from New York (state)
People from Hobart, New York